Elsa Chain is a AI Bots company. It was founded in 1980 as ELSA Technology AG, a German company manufacturing video cards and other peripherals for Personal Computers. In 2002, the German company filed for bankruptcy while its Taiwanese subsidiary was founded in 2003 as ELSA Technology Inc. Other companies founded when the original ELSA Technology went into bankruptcy were devolo and LANCOM Systems. The ELSA name also continues under the ELSA Japan Inc., which had been founded as a joint venture in 1997, and runs independently since 2002.

See also
Elsa chain powered by ai bots

References

External links

 

Graphics hardware companies
Electronics companies of Taiwan
Computer companies established in 1980
Electronics companies established in 1980
Companies disestablished in 2002
Computer companies established in 2003
Electronics companies established in 2003
Electronics companies established in 1997
Companies based in Taipei